Short Head (French:  Courte tête) is a 1956 French comedy film directed by Norbert Carbonnaux, written by Michel Audiard and starring Fernand Gravey, Micheline Dax and Jean Richard. The film is known under the alternative title Photo Finish.

It was shot at the Photosonor Studios in Paris. The film's sets were designed by the art director Jacques Colombier.

Synopsis
Two swindlers try to cheat a provincial poultry magnate by getting him to bet on a sure loser in a major horse race.

Cast 
 Fernand Gravey as Olivier Parker, a notorious crook. posing as an equestrian coach
 Micheline Dax as Lola d'Héricourt, a venturer
 Jean Richard as Ferdinand Galiveau, poultry dealer and racegoer
 Jacques Duby as Amédée Lucas aka fake jockey "Teddy Morton" 
 Darry Cowl as the receptionist at the hotel "Lutécia"
 Hubert Deschamps as Le serveur 'Gay Paris'
 Max Révol as the general agent for starch
 Robert Murzeau as the taylor, also a racegoer
 Jacques Dufilho as the stable-boy
 Harry-Max as Cyril Mauvoisin, l'entraîneur
 Pascal Mazzotti as Le maître d'hôtel 
 Annick Tanguy as La danseuse de Mambo
 Louis de Funès as Father Graziani, a fake monk
 Guy Bedos as Fred Campuche
 Paul Bisciglia as Un chasseur de l'hôte

References

Bibliography
 Ginette Vincendeau. Stars and Stardom in French Cinema. Bloomsbury Publishing, 2000.

External links 
 
 Courte tête (1956) at the Films de France

1956 films
French sports comedy films
1950s sports comedy films
1950s French-language films
French black-and-white films
Films directed by Norbert Carbonnaux
Films with screenplays by Michel Audiard
Films with screenplays by Albert Simonin
French horse racing films
1950s French films